Paul Andrew may refer to:

 Paul Andrew (rugby union) (born 1989), Cornish rugby union player
 Paul Andrew (designer) (fl. 1990s–2010s), English fashion designer

See also
 Paul Andreu (1938–2018), French architect
 Paul Andrews (disambiguation)